Yulia Anggraeni (born 10 July 1994) is an Indonesian cricketer who plays for the national cricket team as an all-rounder. She was the first player, male or female, to score a century for Indonesia in a Twenty20 International.

Early life and education 
, Anggraeni was studying for a Masters in Postgraduate Sports Education at the State University of Jakarta (UNJ).

International career 
Anggraeni was a member of the Indonesian team that emerged as runners-up to Thailand in the women's T20 tournament at the 2017 Southeast Asian Games, and played in the final. She was also a member of Indonesia's squad at the 2018 ASEAN Women's T20 Open Tournament in Thailand in March 2018, but the matches in that competition did not have full Women's Twenty20 International (WT20I) status.

On 12 January 2019, Anggraeni made her WT20I debut for Indonesia against Hong Kong at the Asian Institute of Technology Ground, Bangkok, in the first Group B match of the 2019 Thailand Women's T20 Smash, which was also Indonesia's first ever WT20I. When Myanmar played two T20Is against Indonesia in Bali during its tour of Singapore and Indonesia in April 2019, Anggraeni captained the Indonesia team to victory in both matches. In the 2019 ICC Women's Qualifier EAP, held in Vanuatu in May 2019, Anggraeni was the second highest run scorer, with a total of 104 runs in what was an impressive first appearance by Indonesia at an ICC Women’s event.

On 21 December 2019, in the second match of a bilateral series between Indonesia and the Philippines at the Friendship Oval, Dasmariñas, Philippines, Anggraeni, who was again captaining Indonesia in the series, became the first player, male or female, to score a century for Indonesia in a T20I. She made 112, and also shared with Kadek Winda Prastini in a first wicket partnership of 257 in 19.4 overs, the highest ever WT20I partnership for any wicket. Indonesia finished its innings with 260/1, the third highest ever T20I team total, men's or women's, and won the match by 182 runs.

See also 
 List of centuries in women's Twenty20 International cricket
 List of Indonesia women Twenty20 International cricketers

References

External links 

 

1994 births
Living people
Indonesian women cricketers
Indonesia women Twenty20 International cricketers
Southeast Asian Games silver medalists for Indonesia
Southeast Asian Games medalists in cricket
Competitors at the 2017 Southeast Asian Games
21st-century Indonesian women